Jenifer Jeanette Lewis (born January 25, 1957) is an American actress. She began her career appearing in Broadway musicals and worked as a back-up singer for Bette Midler before appearing in films Beaches (1988) and Sister Act (1992). Lewis is known for playing roles of mothers in the films What's Love Got to Do With It (1993), Poetic Justice (1993), The Preacher's Wife (1996), The Brothers (2001), The Cookout (2004), Think Like a Man (2012) and in the sequel Think Like a Man Too (2014), Baggage Claim (2013) and The Wedding Ringer (2015), as well as in The Temptations miniseries (1998).

Lewis is known unofficially as "The Mother of Black Hollywood" (also the name of her memoir) given her frequent matriarchal film and television roles. She also provided the voice for Mama Odie in Disney's animated feature The Princess and the Frog (2009), and Flo in Pixar's Cars series. Additional film roles include Dead Presidents (1995), Cast Away (2000) and Hereafter (2010).
 
On television, Lewis starred as Lana Hawkins in the Lifetime medical drama Strong Medicine from 2000 to 2006. She also had recurring roles on sitcoms A Different World, The Fresh Prince of Bel-Air and Girlfriends. In 2014, Lewis began starring as Ruby Johnson in the ABC comedy series Black-ish, for which she received two Critics' Choice Television Award nominations.

Early life
Lewis was born in Kinloch, Missouri, a suburb of St. Louis, to a nurse's aide mother, Dorothy, and a factory worker father. Lewis is the youngest of seven children. She sang in her church choir at the age of five. She attended Kinloch High School and then college at Webster University in Webster Groves, Missouri. She received an honorary degree from Webster in 2015. After college, Lewis moved to New York.

Career

1970s–1980s
Soon after she arrived in New York City, Lewis debuted on Broadway in a small role in Eubie (1979), the musical based on the work of Eubie Blake. She next landed the role of Effie White in the workshop of the Michael Bennett–directed musical Dreamgirls, but when the show moved to Broadway, Bennett chose Jennifer Holliday for the role.

Lewis accepted a position as a Harlette, a back-up singer for Bette Midler which led to Lewis' first TV appearances on Midler's HBO specials. She acquired her first screen role as a result, appearing as a singer in the Otto Titsling production number in the Bette Midler vehicle Beaches (1988). At the same time, Lewis was developing her nightclub act, The Diva Is Dismissed, an autobiographical comedy and music show in New York City cabarets. She performed the show off-Broadway at the Public Theater.

1990s
After Lewis relocated to Los Angeles, she began appearing in television sitcoms, including Murphy Brown, Dream On, In Living Color, Roc, Hangin' with Mr. Cooper and Friends. From 1992 to 1993, she played Dean Davenport in the sixth and final season of the NBC sitcom A Different World. She also had a recurring role as Will Smith's Aunt Helen in the NBC sitcom The Fresh Prince of Bel-Air from 1991 to 1996. As a series regular, Lewis starred alongside Patricia Wettig in her short-lived legal drama Courthouse in 1995, playing Judge Rosetta Reide, the first main African American lesbian character on television.

In 1992, Lewis was cast as one of the back-up singers to Whoopi Goldberg in the comedy film Sister Act. The following year, Lewis played the mother of Tupac Shakur's character in the film Poetic Justice, and as Zelma Bullock, Tina Turner's mother, in the biopic What's Love Got to Do With It starring Angela Bassett. Lewis has stated that she never auditioned to play Turner, but would have been thrilled to play the iconic singer. Lewis is only one year older than Bassett. For her performance, she received her first NAACP Image Award for Outstanding Supporting Actress in a Motion Picture nomination. In 1994, she followed with other comedic supporting roles, including Mrs. Coleman, the Unemployment Office lady, in Renaissance Man and as Whoopi Goldberg's sister in Corrina, Corrina. In 1995, she was cast in maternal roles to Kadeem Hardison in Panther and to Larenz Tate in Dead Presidents.

In 1996, Lewis appeared as Theresa Randle's telephone sex line boss in the film Girl 6. Later that year, she played Whitney Houston's character's mother in the film The Preacher's Wife, for which she received her second NAACP Image Award nomination. She also had roles in The Mighty (1998), The Temptations miniseries (1998), Mystery Men (1999) and Blast from the Past (1999), and the leading role in the film Jackie's Back (1999).

2000s
In 2000, Lewis had a supporting role in the adventure drama film Cast Away, directed by Robert Zemeckis. In the same year, she began starring as Lana Hawkins on the Lifetime television medical drama Strong Medicine, for which she also performed the theme song. The show ended in February 2006. She also voiced Flo in Pixar's Cars franchise. She also had a recurring role as Veretta Childs (Toni's mother) in the UPN sitcom Girlfriends. In film, she appeared as Morris Chestnut's mother in the romantic comedy The Brothers (2001). In 2006, she had a featured role as the wedding planner in Tyler Perry's Madea's Family Reunion, and also appeared in Perry's comedy-drama Meet the Browns (2008) as Vera Brown. She also appeared in Juwanna Mann (2002), The Cookout (2004), Nora's Hair Salon (2004), Dirty Laundry (2006) and Not Easily Broken (2009).

On April 22, 2008, Lewis replaced Darlene Love as Motormouth Maybelle in Broadway's Hairspray. On television, she guest-starred on That's So Raven and Boston Legal. Lewis also had a number of voice acting roles, including Walt Disney Animation Studios's animated musical The Princess and the Frog (2009), for which she was nominated for the Annie Award for Voice Acting in a Feature Production.

2010s
In June 2010, Lewis told the Jazz Joy and Roy syndicated radio show: "I just did a production of Hello Dolly at the 5th Avenue Theatre in Seattle and it had to be one of the greatest productions that I have ever done, because I got to just do a character, Dolly Levi, and it was just great." In 2012, Lewis began working with Shangela on the online reality show parody Jenifer Lewis and Shangela, where she acts as herself alongside Shangela, a "drag queen living in her basement." She later appeared in Shangela's music video for "Werqin Girl (Professional)".

In 2010, Clint Eastwood cast Lewis in his fantasy film Hereafter. The following year, she starred alongside Rosario Dawson and Tracee Ellis Ross in Five, for which she received her third NAACP Image Award nomination. She also co-starred in the short-lived NBC series The Playboy Club. She played Terrence J's overbearing mother in box-office hit Think Like a Man (2012) and its sequel Think Like a Man Too (2014). In 2013, she played Paula Patton's mother in the romantic comedy Baggage Claim. In 2015, she starred in the romantic comedy The Wedding Ringer.

In 2014, Lewis was cast as Ruby Johnson, Anthony Anderson's character's mother in the ABC comedy series Black-ish. She was elevated to series regular status as of the second season. In 2016, she received Critics' Choice Television Award for Best Guest Performer in a Comedy Series nomination for her performance. She has also been featured in various TV commercials.

In 2017, she published a book about her life and career, entitled The Mother of Black Hollywood, in which she shared her life experiences with Whoopi Goldberg, Loretta Devine, Chris Rock, Bette Midler, Rosie O'Donnell, Liza Minnelli, Whitney Houston and Aretha Franklin.

Personal life

Lewis has been married to Arnold Byrd since 2012. She has an adopted daughter named Charmaine Lewis.

In 1990, Lewis was diagnosed with bipolar disorder. She originally hid her diagnosis, as she felt ashamed, but eventually came to embrace it after 17 years of therapy and 10 years of medication. In a 2014 interview, she said: "You have to look in the mirror... and say—before you can go or grow into anything—you have to say you love yourself."

Filmography

Film

Television

Video games

Music videos

Theme parks

References

External links
 
 
 
 

1957 births
Living people
People from St. Louis County, Missouri
20th-century African-American women singers
American voice actresses
Actresses from Missouri
People with bipolar disorder
American television actresses
African-American actresses
American film actresses
20th-century American actresses
21st-century American actresses
Webster University alumni
Harlettes members
American stage actresses
21st-century African-American women
21st-century African-American people